Microdesmis is a genus of plant of the family Pandaceae. It is native to  tropical Africa, China and Southeast Asia.

Microdesmis afrodecandra Floret, A.M.Louis & J.M.Reitsma - Gabon
Microdesmis camerunensis J.Léonard - Cameroon, Gabon, Congo-Brazzaville
Microdesmis caseariifolia Planch. ex Hook -Guangdong, Guangxi, Hainan, Yunnan, Bangladesh, Cambodia, Borneo, Sumatra, Laos, Malaysia, Myanmar, Philippines, Thailand, Vietnam
Microdesmis haumaniana J.Léonard - Gabon, Congo-Brazzaville, Zaïre, Angola
Microdesmis kasaiensis J.Léonard - Zaïre
Microdesmis keayana J.Léonard - Benin,  Ghana, Guinea, Ivory Coast, Liberia, Sierra Leone, Togo, Nigeria 
Microdesmis klainei J.Léonard - Gabon
Microdesmis magallanensis (Elmer) Steenis - Luzon, Sibuyan
Microdesmis pierlotiana J.Léonard - Cameroon, Gabon, Congo-Brazzaville, Zaïre, Central African Republic 
Microdesmis puberula Hook.f. ex Planch - widespread across central Africa from Nigeria east to Uganda, south to Angola
Microdesmis yafungana J.Léonard - Zaïre

References

Pandaceae
Malpighiales genera